is a Japanese footballer who plays for Tokyo Verdy.

Club statistics
Updated to 19 July 2022.

References

External links

Profile at Omiya Ardija

1993 births
Living people
Meiji University alumni
Association football people from Tochigi Prefecture
Japanese footballers
J1 League players
J2 League players
Omiya Ardija players
Association football defenders